Gaia (also spelled Gaea) is a primordial deity and the personification of the Earth in Greek mythology.

Gaia or Gaea may also refer to:

Environmentalism
Gaia hypothesis, concerns the stability of Earth's natural systems
Gaia philosophy, the concept that living organisms will improve their environment
Gaia, the Earth in Gaianism

Science and technology
Gaea (crater), crater on Amalthea, a moon of Jupiter
1184 Gaea, a minor planet in the main asteroid belt
Gaia, an alternative name for the early Earth
Gaia spacecraft, European space mission launched in 2013
Gaia catalogues, several star catalogues
Gaia, the user interface of Firefox OS
GAIA, a profile and sign-in system in Google

Film and television
Gaia (Rome character), character in the historical-drama television series Rome (2005–2007)
Ultraman Gaia, a character in the tokusatsu television series of the same name (1998)
Gaea, a planet in the anime television series The Vision of Escaflowne (1996)
Gaia, a character in the drama television series Spartacus: Gods of the Arena (2011)
Gaia, the spirit of Earth in the animated television series Captain Planet and the Planeteers (1990–1996)
Gaia, the spirit of Earth in the British TV series Edge of Darkness (1985)
Gaia (film), 2021 South African horror thriller film.

Video games
Game Artificial Intelligence with Agents, an engine in Outcast (1999)
GAIA, fictional highly advanced A.I. character in Horizon Zero Dawn (2017)
Gaia (Final Fantasy VII), a fictional world
Gaia, cancelled video game by Electronic Arts' Motive Studios

Places
Grantley Adams International Airport, Barbados
Vila Nova de Gaia, a city and municipality in northern Portugal
Gaia River, Romania
Gaia, a village in Murgași Commune, Dolj County, Romania
Gaià River, a river in Catalonia
Gaià, a village in Catalonia
Gaia (a.k.a. Sofia), one of the Echinades islands in the Ionian Sea
Gaia, a rock climbing route at Black Rocks (Derbyshire)

Literature
Gaea trilogy, a series of science-fiction novels (1979, 1980 and 1984) by John Varley
Gaia Gear, a series of five novels by Yoshiyuki Tomino
GAIA (journal), an academic journal concerned with environmental and sustainability problems
Gaia Moore, the heroine of the teen-novel series Fearless by Francine Pascal
Gaean Reach, a fictional region in space in works by Jack Vance
Gaea, an island in the young-adult novel The Arm of the Starfish (1965) by Madeleine L'Engle
Gaea, a character in the dystopian fiction novella Anthem (1937) by Ayn Rand
Gaea, a character in the fictional novel series The Heroes of Olympus (2010) by Rick Riordan
Gaia (a.k.a. gaiaphage), a supernatural creature in the novel series Gone by Michael Grant
Gaia Girls, an environmental fantasy children's book series by Lee Welles
Gaia, a fantasy comic by Oliver Knörzer and Puri Andini hosted on their Sandra and Woo website

Music
GAIA Chamber Music Festival, a music festival in Thun, Switzerland
SH-01 GAIA, a synthesizer manufactured by Roland Corporation
Gaia (band), a Dutch trance project started by Armin van Buuren

Albums
Gaia (2002), an album by the Japanese rock band Janne Da Arc
Gaia (1994), an EP by the Swedish metal band Tiamat
Gaia (Mägo de Oz album) (2003)
Gaia (Marilyn Crispell album) (1988)
Gaia: One Woman's Journey, a 1994 album by the Australian singer Olivia Newton-John
Gaia-Onbashira, a 1998 album by the Japanese New Age musician Kitarō
GAIA, a 2003 album by Alan Simon
GAIA, a 2020 album by Blank Banshee

Songs
"Gaia", a song from the album Fireships (1993) by English singer Peter Hammill
"Gaia", a song from the album Gaia-Onbashira (1998) by Japanese New Age musician Kitarō
"Gaia", a song from the album Hourglass (1997) by American singer James Taylor
"Gaia", a song from the album Omnium Gatherum (2022) by Australian psychedelic rock band King Gizzard & the Lizard Wizard
"Gaea", a song from the album So Early in the Spring (1989) by British rock band Pentangle
"Gaia", a song from the album Synchestra (2006) by Canadian rock musician Devin Townsend 
"Gaia", a song from the album Valensia (1993) by Dutch rock singer Valensia
"Gaia", a song from the album Wildhoney (1994) by Swedish metal band Tiamat

Organisations
Gaia (arts venue), an arts center in Havana, Cuba
Gaia Earth Sciences, an oilfield services company
Gaia, Inc., formerly Gaiam, an online video subscription service
Gaea Japan, a wrestling promotion that terminated in 2005
GAIA locomotive, a former Argentine locomotive builder
Gaia Foundation, an organization promoting sustainable development
Gaia Movement USA, a USA-based charitable organization
Gaia Online, a social networking website
Gaia Trafikk, a former Norwegian company

People

Given name
Gaia (singer), Italian singer
Gaia (artist), American street artist
Gaea Schell, pianist/composer and singer
Gaia Germani (born 1942), Italian actress
Gaia Cauchi (born 2002), Maltese singer
Gaia Vince, British journalist, broadcaster and non-fiction author
Gaia Weiss (born 1991), French actress and model

Surname
Brian Gaia (born 1994), American football player
Michele Gaia (born 1985), Italian cyclist
Santos Gaia (born 1978), Brazilian footballer

Other uses
Armin van Buuren (born 1976), DJ who uses the pseudonym Gaia
Gaia (chimpanzee), a chimpanzee
Toyota Gaia, a multi-purpose vehicle
Gaia the Fierce Knight, a card in Yu-Gi-Oh! Trading Card Game
Gaia, the spaceship from The Magellanic Cloud by Stanisław Lem

See also
Gai (disambiguation)
Gaia (comics), several meanings
Gaja (disambiguation)
Gaya (disambiguation)
Kaia (disambiguation)
Gaian (disambiguation)